Shout! The Legend of the Wild One is an Australian musical based on the life of Johnny O'Keefe. It premiered in Melbourne at the State Theatre in December 2000, before seasons in Sydney, Adelaide and Brisbane through 2001. A jukebox musical, it includes songs recorded by O'Keefe and other period songs from the 1950s and 1960s.

The original production was directed by Richard Wherrett and featured David Campbell as O'Keefe. Each was nominated at the 2001 Helpmann Awards, for Best Direction of a Musical and Best Male Actor in a Musical respectively. The original production was remounted for a national tour in January 2008 starring Tim Campbell as O'Keefe.

Plot
In the mid 1970s Johnny O'Keefe shows his new fiancé to see the Sydney Stadium before it is demolished. He begins to reminisce about his life, growing up in Sydney and falling for Marianne, a German immigrant. When he hears "Rock Around the Clock" by Bill Haley and the Comets he discovers a passion for rock music and persuades Lee Gordon to promote him.

O'Keefe becomes famous and successful. But he is involved in a car crash and fails to crack the US market. He and Gordon fall out, his marriage collapses and Gordon dies.

However O'Keefe makes a comeback in the 1970s.

Cast information

Cast recording

Shout! The Legend of The Wild One original cast recording was released in March 2001. The album was certified gold in Australia. 
It received the ARIA Award for Best Original Cast/Show Album in 2001.

Track listing
 "Sing (And Tell The Blues So Long)" - 2:05
 "Wild One (Real Wild Child)"- 2:05
 "Cry" - 2:15
 "Save the Last Dance For Me" (with Tamsin Carroll)- 3:59
 "Rock and Roll will Stand" (with Kevin Murphy) -2:04
 "Right Now"	- 1:36
 "Move Baby Move" - 2:15
 "Crazy" (by Tamsin Carroll) - 2:31
 "(The) Sun's Gonna Shine Tomorrow" - 2:27
 "He Wears My Ring" (by Trisha Noble) - 1:47
 "She's My Baby"	- 2:08
 "Ready For You" (with Tamsin Carroll) - 1:51
 "Get a Job" (by Paul Biencourt) - 1:40
 "Hit Record" - 2:34
 "Chapel of Love" (by Tamsin Carroll) - 2:26
 "I'm Gonna Knock on Your Door" - 2:09
 "Holdin' You In My Holden" (by Sara Highlands, Carly O'Rourke, Eve Prideaux) - 1:10
 "Mockingbird" (with Trisha Noble and Katie McCarthy) - 2:37
 "I'm Counting On You" (with Tamsin Carroll)- 2:58
 "So Tough" - 1:49
 "Tourin' Time" (by Australian cast) - 2:34
 "Purple People Eater"/"Witch Doctor" (with Aaron Blabey) -2:37
 "Mr. Bass Man" (with Kurt Sneddon) 1:49
 "Bye Bye Baby" (by Anton Koritni) - 2:34
 "She Wears My Ring" - 2:37
 "Rock Around the Clock" - 2:11
 "What'd I Say" - 2:55
 "Shout!" - 5:44

Charts and certifications

Weekly charts

Year-end charts

Certifications

References

External links

Production details at Origin Theatrical
Review of 2006 Williamstown Production at The Age
Review of 2008 production at Variety

2000 musicals
ARIA Award-winning albums
Australian musicals
Jukebox musicals